Showq, also rendered as Shogh, may refer to:
 Showq-e Olya
 Showq-e Sofla